The 1915 Philadelphia Athletics season was a season in American baseball. After the team won the American League pennant in 1914, the team dropped all the way to last place with a record of 43 wins and 109 losses.

Offseason 
 December 8, 1914: Eddie Collins was purchased from the Athletics by the Chicago White Sox.
 January 1915, Nap Lajoie was purchased by the Athletics from the Cleveland Indians.

Regular season 
The Federal League had been formed to begin play in 1914. As the A.L. had done 13 years before, the new league raided existing A.L. and N.L. teams for players. Athletics owner Connie Mack refused to match the offers of the F.L. teams, preferring to let the "prima donnas" go and rebuild with younger (and less expensive) players. The result was a swift and near-total collapse, a "first-to-worst" situation. The Athletics went from a 99–53 (.651) record and a pennant in 1914 to a record of 43–109 (.283) and 8th (last) place in 1915. At the time, it was the third-worst winning percentage in American League history. The infield of Whitey Witt, Charlie Pick and Nap Lajoie was derisively known as the "$10 Infield".

Season highlights 
 June 23, 1915: Athletics pitcher Bruno Haas set an American League record by walking 16 Yankees in one game.

Season standings

Record vs. opponents

Roster

Player stats

Batting

Starters by position 
Note: Pos = Position; G = Games played; AB = At bats; H = Hits; Avg. = Batting average; HR = Home runs; RBI = Runs batted in

Other batters 
Note: G = Games played; AB = At bats; H = Hits; Avg. = Batting average; HR = Home runs; RBI = Runs batted in

Pitching

Starting pitchers 
Note: G = Games pitched; IP = Innings pitched; W = Wins; L = Losses; ERA = Earned run average; SO = Strikeouts

Other pitchers 
Note: G = Games pitched; IP = Innings pitched; W = Wins; L = Losses; ERA = Earned run average; SO = Strikeouts

Relief pitchers 
Note: G = Games pitched; W = Wins; L = Losses; SV = Saves; ERA = Earned run average; SO = Strikeouts

Awards and honors

League top five finishers 
Rube Bressler
 #2 in AL in earned runs allowed (103)

Bullet Joe Bush
 #3 in AL in wild pitches (10)

Rube Oldring
 #2 in AL in home runs (6)

Weldon Wyckoff
 AL leader in losses (22)
 AL leader in earned runs allowed (108)
 AL leader in walks allowed (165)
 AL leader in wild pitches (14)
 #3 in AL in strikeouts (157)

References

External links
1915 Philadelphia Athletics team page at Baseball Reference
1915 Philadelphia Athletics team page at www.baseball-almanac.com

Oakland Athletics seasons
Philadelphia Athletics season
1915 in sports in Pennsylvania